Maromiandra is a town and commune in Madagascar. It belongs to the district of Ikongo, which is a part of Vatovavy-Fitovinany Region. The population of the commune was estimated to be approximately 12,000 in 2001 commune census.

Only primary schooling is available. The majority 95% of the population of the commune are farmers.  The most important crops are coffee and rice, while other important agricultural products are sugarcane and cassava. Services provide employment for 5% of the population.

References and notes 

Populated places in Vatovavy-Fitovinany